Habitat for Humanity New York City (Habitat NYC) was founded in 1984 as an independent affiliate of Habitat for Humanity International.  Habitat NYC works in all five boroughs of New York City, building homes for ownership by working families and individuals in need. In August 2015, Karen Haycox was appointed CEO of Habitat NYC.

History
The first New York area Habitat for Humanity affiliate was founded on the Lower East Side in 1982.  In 1984, former president Jimmy Carter and his wife Rosalynn Carter volunteered there as part of the First Annual Jimmy Carter Work Project (JCWP). In 1985 the Carters returned for the Second Annual JCWP.  The first Habitat building in New York City was a 19 unit building on East 6th Street completed in December 1986.  In 1995, four different New York City affiliates were united to form one affiliate – Habitat NYC.  Habitat for Humanity International's 100,000th home worldwide was built in Harlem in 2000.  In 2009, Habitat NYC opened the largest multifamily complex ever built by a U.S. Habitat affiliate, a 41-condominium complex on Atlantic Avenue in Ocean Hill-Brownsville, Brooklyn. Built to high green standards, this complex earned a LEED Gold certification. A 2008 Economic Impact Report on the Atlantic Avenue Complex found that the project would generate about $34.5 million in economic activity over 40 years.

Building and home ownership
Habitat NYC has adapted the model to work in New York City's complex urban building environment.
They acquire land and buildings from New York's City's Department of Housing Preservation and Development and other governmental agencies for a nominal fee. Professional architects design the buildings and professional contractors build the exterior shells to conform to the city's strict building code. Once the exterior is complete, volunteers and Habitat NYC homebuyers build the interiors and complete the finish work.

The homeowners also get free classes in financial literacy and building maintenance.  They receive a 2%, 30-year fixed mortgage, contribute a cash down-payment of 1% (compared to the standard 20%), enjoy property-tax abatements and live in an energy-efficient home.

To qualify, potential homebuyers must be of low- to moderate-income, have good credit (a FICO score of 620 or higher), be willing to contribute "sweat equity" to help build their home and be a first-time homeowner.

References

Social welfare charities based in the United States
Organizations established in 1984
New York